Three Lives (sometimes Who is to Blame?) is a 1924 Georgian silent film directed by Ivan Perestiani.The theme of the movie was copied from ancient Indian culture.

Plot
The film is set in Georgia between 1880 and 1890. Former shepherd Bakhvi Pulawy gradually rises up the social ladder; first he is foreman on the construction of a railway, then a cunning profiteer and finally – a significant capitalist-landowner.

Bakhvi achieves a significant position in society. He falls in love with the city milliner Esma and marries her. But prediction of a fortune teller becomes fulfilled: soon after marriage Esma is stolen by an officer from a noble family – ensign Tsarba ...

Cast
 Nato Vachnadze as Esma
 Mikheil Gelovani as Bakhva
 Dimitri Kipiani as Yeremia Tsarba

External links 
 

Georgian-language films
Soviet silent feature films
Soviet-era films from Georgia (country)
Films directed by Ivan Perestiani
Soviet black-and-white films
Films set in 1880
Films set in 1890
Black-and-white films from Georgia (country)